Albert Mullin (August 25, 1933 – May 16, 2017) was an American engineer and Mathematician who is best known for his postulation of the Euclid–Mullin sequence.

Biography

Early life
Albert Mullin was born on August 25, 1933 to LeRoy Mullin and Alleyne Mullin in Lynn, Massachusetts. He earned his bachelor's degree in Electrical Engineering from Syracuse University in 1955. He went on to earn a master's degree in Electrical Engineering from MIT and a master's degree in Mathematics from the University of Illinois.

Career
Albert became a commissioned Army officer and served for a period of 38 years. He retired from the Army in 1993 having attained the rank of Colonel. He continued to serve as an army civilian with the Space and Strategic Command. During his time as an Army officer and continuing on through his death he was a periodic contributor to the Journal of the American Mathematical Society, the Journal of Symbolic Logic, and the Notre Dame Journal of Formal Logic.

Honors
 Bronze Star Medal

Bibliography
 Research Problem 8:  Recursive function theory (A modern look at a Euclidean idea), Bull. Amer. Math. Soc., 69 (1963), 737.
 Review: M. D. Mesarovic and Y. Takahara, General systems theory: Mathematical foundations, Bull. Amer. Math. Soc., 81 (1975), 1047–1044.
  On new theorems for elementary number theory, Notre Dame Journal of Formal Logic, Vol. 8, Issue 4 1967, 353–356.
  A note on a weakened Goldbach-like conjecture, Notre Dame Journal of Formal Logic, Vol. 3, Issue 2 1962, 118–119.

See also
Euclid–Mullin sequence

Notes and references

Mathematicians from Massachusetts
Number theorists
1933 births
2017 deaths